is a series of Japanese films. The trilogy of films were all shot simultaneously and released in 1966 with three different directors and predominantly the same crew. The series was produced by Daiei Film and contained similar plot structures involving villages being overthrown by warlords, leading to the villagers attempting to reach out to Daimajin, the great demon god, to save them.

The Daimajin series was revived in 2010 as a television drama titled Daimajin Kanon, broadcast on TV Tokyo. The Daimajin character also appears in the 2021 film The Great Yokai War: Guardians.

Films

Daimajin

In Japan, a household of peasants cower during a series of earth tremors that are interpreted as the escape attempts of Daimajin, a spirit trapped within the mountain. These events are observed by Lord Hanabasa, and his chamberlain, Samanosuke, who are attempting to seize power in the area. As the villagers pray at a shrine, Samanosuke and his henchmen slaughter Hanabasa's family, with only his son and daughter escaping, who are assisted by the samurai Kogenta. Back at the shrine, Samanosuke's men begin to take over and forbid gatherings at the shrine. After failing to warn Samanosuke about his actions, the priestess Shinobu returns home, finding Kogenta and the two children. Shinobu takes them up the side of the mountain into forbidden territory, where the stone idol which is Daimajin stands, half-buried in the side of the mountain. The children grow to adulthood with the son, Tadafumi (Yoshihiko Aoyama) reaching his 18th birthday. Meanwhile, Samanosuke has enslaved the village. After several attempts to return peace and freedom to the village, Samanosuke's men travel up the mountain to smash Daimajin. Damaijin is asked by the daughter, Kozasa (Miwa Takada) to save her brother, with the idol removing a mask to reveal Daimajin's real face, leading it to rise from the mountain and exact its wrath on Samanosuke and his fortress. Daimajin's wrath begins to grow to attacking everything in sight, only stopping when Kozasa's tears land on Daimajin's feet.

The film was released in the United States by Daiei International with subtitles in an English-dubbed version by Bernard Lewis. The film has been released under many English alternative titles, such as The Devil Got Angry, The Vengeance of the Monster, and Majin, the Monster of Terror.

Return of Daimajin
In Japan, Daimajin is found on an island in the middle of a lake which is surrounded by two peaceful villages, Chigusa and Nagoshi. In a distant third village ruled by an evil lord, the citizens flee to Chigusa to take refuge. One day, the evil lord decides to take over the two villages and attempts to do so at an annual festival. After being pursued by the evil lord's army, the people of Chigusa and Nagoshi find themselves on the island with the Daimajin statue. The evil lord has his men shatter the statue with a large amount of gunpowder. Daimajin's shattered remains end up at the bottom of the lake. Daimajin awakens to inflict chaos to all around it, including the landscape and the evil lord.

Return of Daimajin was never released theatrically in the United States, but was released to television by AIP-TV in 1967.

Daimajin Strikes Again
In Japan, Daimajin is found at the top of a mountain. Fathers in a village have been captured by an evil lord and forced to work in labor camps. Four of their sons decide to go rescue them, even if it means crossing the mountain where Daimajin is. The four sons pay their respects to the statue when they pass it so that they do not incur its wrath. The evil lord eventually angers the statue, who comes to life and destroys all those who have not been paying respect to it. The children and their fathers are spared, while the work camp is destroyed.

Daimajin Strikes Again was never released theatrically in the United States, but received the international English title of The Return of Majin.

Recurring cast and characters
 This table only includes characters which have appeared in more than one film.
 A dark grey cell indicates the character was not in the film, or that the character's presence in the film has not yet been announced.

Crew

Home media

References

Citations

Sources

External links
 
 
 

1966 films
Daiei Film tokusatsu films
Kadokawa Dwango franchises
Kaiju
Fantasy film series
Fictional samurai
Fictional golems
Fictional demons and devils
ADV Films
Japanese film series
Trilogies
1960s Japanese films